The State Basketball League Most Improved Player was an annual State Basketball League (SBL) award given between 2004 and 2019 to the most improved player of the regular season in both the Men's SBL and Women's SBL. The award was established following the league's decision to discontinue Rookie of the Year—an award given every year between 1992 and 2003.

Winners

References

Most Improved Player
Awards established in 2004
Awards disestablished in 2019
Most improved awards